Riacho das Almas (population 20,646) is a city in northeastern Brazil, in the State of Pernambuco. It lies in the mesoregion of Agreste of Pernambuco and has 313.99 sq/km of total area.

Geography

 State - Pernambuco
 Region - Agreste of Pernambuco
 Boundaries - Surubim and Frei Miguelinho   (N);  Caruaru   (S and W);   Bezerros and Cumaru  (E).
 Area - 313.99 km2
 Elevation - 407 m
 Hydrography - Capibaribe and Ipojuca rivers
 Vegetation - Caatinga hipoxerófila
 Annual average temperature - 23.6 c
 Distance to Recife - 152 km

Economy
The main economic activities in Riacho das Almas are the textile industry and agribusiness, especially farming of cattle, goats, sheep, pigs, chickens; and plantations of pineapples and manioc.

Economic Indicators

Economy by Sector (2006)

Health Indicators

References

Municipalities in Pernambuco